Nencho Staykov, born 19 December 1955) is a Bulgarian former cyclist. He competed in the individual road race and team time trial events at the 1980 Summer Olympics.

He is a 1984 Tour of Turkey general classification winner and three-time Tour of Bulgaria general classification winner (1978, 1980 and 1984). He won two stages at the Peace Race and finished second overall in 1984.

References

External links
 

1955 births
Living people
Bulgarian male cyclists
Olympic cyclists of Bulgaria
Cyclists at the 1980 Summer Olympics
Place of birth missing (living people)